Mr. Noodles is the brand name of a Canadian instant noodles product, dating back to the 1970s. Imported by Anderson Watts Ltd. of Vancouver and manufactured by partner Beltek Foods of Huizhou, China, the Mr. Noodles brand is sold in packages the same size of traditional ramen. Mr. Noodles is sold in instant ramen packs (single, dual or multi-pack), instant ramen cups or instant ramen bowls. It is sold at grocery and convenience stores, and sometimes in vending machines.

Vice magazine's article “The Definitive Ranking of the Best Late-Night Snacks for Canadian Students” considered mixing a box of Kraft Dinner and Mr. Noodles as “God-Level Drunk Food Tier”.

A newer offering from the company is its Kimchi Noodle bowls which have a spicier flavour.

See also
 Sapporo Ichiban
 Mr Lee's Noodles
 List of instant noodle brands

References

External links
 Beltek Foods

Instant noodle brands
Canadian snack foods